Chernovka is a rural locality (a selo) and the administrative center of Chernovsky Selsoviet of Svobodnensky District, Amur Oblast, Russia. The population was 633 as of 2018. There are 7 streets.

Geography 
Chernovka is located on the right bank of the Bolshaya Pyora River, 33 km north of Svobodny (the district's administrative centre) by road. Chembary is the nearest rural locality.

References 

Rural localities in Svobodnensky District